Sapir, meaning sapphire in Hebrew, may refer to:

Sapir (surname), including a list of people with the surname
Sapir, Israel, a moshav in Israel
Sapir, an online journal edited by Bret Stephens

See also

Sapir Academic College
Sapir Prize

Michael Sapir , CEO to Sapir Real Estate Development is an American Real Estate Developer and Attorney in New York.